Mesmero (Vincent) is a mutant supervillain appearing in American comic books published by Marvel Comics.

Publication history
Mesmero first appeared in The X-Men #49 and was created by Arnold Drake, Don Heck, and Werner Roth.

Fictional character biography
Mesmero was originally a small-time crook who posed as a stage hypnotist at high society parties. He would use his mutant powers to 'mesmerize' guests into giving him their possessions and then making them forget about them. Mesmero drew the attention of Magneto, who wanted him to hypnotize Lorna Dane into believing that she was Magneto's daughter. Mesmero successfully took control of large numbers of latent mutants, and captured Lorna Dane. Mesmero was then revealed to be the aide to Magneto, and battled the X-Men in the city of the Demi-Men. Mesmero's master was later revealed to be a robot in the form of Magneto, and a Sentinel attack resulted in Mesmero being captured by Sentinels. Much later, Mesmero had become a carnival manager and mentally compelled the X-Men to serve as carnival performers. The X-Men freed themselves from his control, and as Mesmero then attacked the X-Men, the real Magneto appeared.  The Master of Magnetism overpowered Mesmero and rendered him unconscious. Magneto then stranded him in a South American jungle.

Mesmero later performed in a Broadway stage show in New York City, where he battled Spider-Man. Mesmero later escaped to Canada. There, he contended with Alpha Flight and was captured by Persuasion. Mesmero later posed as a psychoanalyst to powerful clients in London. He took control of Excalibur and used them to battle Fenris. Mesmero was defeated by Lockheed the dragon and students from St. Searle's School for Young Ladies.

Mesmero has encountered the X-Men on a few other occasions as well as teams such as X-Factor, and the Dark Riders. The Dark Riders intended to kill him, as they believe he was weak. Mesmero uses his powers to convince them they had thrown him off a high ledge. With Alpha Flight, Mesmero takes over the minds of the junior members and is eventually stopped by the senior ones.

When Mesmero joined the latest incarnation of the Weapon X program, the Director offered to increase Mesmero's hypnotic powers. Mesmero agreed and gained the ability to control entire crowds with a mere glance, instead of a mere handful of people.

To keep the public unaware of the "Neverland" mutant concentration camp, Mesmero posed as a government liaison. With this identity, he informed news reporters that "Neverland" doesn't exist nor is the government involved in abducting mutants.

While he was a member of Weapon X, Mesmero visited his dying mother. He had doctors help her as much as they could and used his powers to mesmerise his mother into believing she was healthy as ever. His mother knew it was an illusion, though, and she told him that she knew shortly before she died. Subsequently, Mesmero began to lose confidence in himself which caused him to lose his powers. Mesmero was transported to Neverland upon the Director's discovery of his power loss.

Brent Jackson, planning on raising a coup on Weapon X, rescued Mesmero. Mesmero spent several months in seclusion as Jackson helped him get his confidence back, and with it his powers.

Mesmero eventually lost his powers for good (along with most of the world's mutants) when the Scarlet Witch altered reality at the climax of the House of M event during Decimation. Devastated and ruined, the once-great supervillain was forced into poverty. Mesmero finally achieved a personal triumph by forming a relationship with a woman who had saved his life, promising to somehow help her in turn. She put her trust in him freely and unconditionally, something he had never managed before without the aid of his powers. At this, Mesmero resolved to put his past behind him and begin living as Vincent.

Mesmero eventually returned to his old life of villainy and became the leader of a newly formed Brotherhood of Evil Mutants. He also appeared to have gotten his powers back. He first had his Brotherhood attack the United Nations and was thwarted by the X-Men. He then had his Brotherhood kidnap the mayor of New York City, Bill de Blasio. It was also discovered by the X-Men that Mesmero had used his powers to brainwash the members of his Brotherhood to join the team and force them to carry out those attacks. Once his control was broken, Mesmero's Brotherhood was dissolved, and Mesmero was arrested. The reason for Mesmero's actions was that he was paid by Lydia Nance, director of the anti-mutant Heritage Initiative, to carry out these acts to paint mutants in a bad light.

Powers, abilities, and equipment
Vincent is a mutant with superhuman hypnotic powers. He has the psionic ability to mentally influence the minds of others via eye contact, especially telepaths. Through a combination of careful planning and skill, he could manipulate their minds, even if they were much more prone to realizing/breaking his machinations than a non-psychic. Mesmero can hypnotize people into doing whatever he wants them to, alter their brains with false personalities or memories, and make his victims see him as a different person. He had proven unable to control Magneto, which his helmet that negates all telepathic attacks pertain brainwashing and Alysande Stuart, with her capabilities, for unknown reasons.

At one time, Mesmero wore a costume, which allows him to teleport, leaving only an energy blip where he once stood. That feat was only used for escaping an angry Alpha Flight and may have been controlled entirely by the technology of this suit or tied in some way to his mental capabilities.

Other versions

Exiles
In Exiles, an alternate reality version of Mesmero, originating from the Earth-653 timeline, was involved with the Weapon X Program before being recruited into Weapon X, the more ruthless counterpart of the Exiles. Early after the formation of the team, Mesmero was killed and his body remained in the Timebreakers' fallen heroes gallery in the crystal palace. After the Exiles took over the place, they sent Mesmero's body back to Earth-653. The corpse was teleported back to the facilities of the Weapon X Program, where it was incinerated.

Another alternate version of Mesmero was revealed to have existed on Earth-127. This Mesmero was part of the Brotherhood of Mutants alongside Magneto, Quicksilver and Scarlet Witch (all gender-swapped, with Scarlet Witch now being called Scarlet Warlock). They planned to make Magneto (who was female in this reality) even powerful than she already was by removing Wolverine's adamantium skeleton out of his body and transfer it into Magneto's body. However the plan went wrong, and Mesmero and the other Brotherhood members fused into one powerful mutant being known as "Brother Mutant".

Age of Apocalypse
In the Age of Apocalypse timeline, Mesmero joined with a group of low level telepaths to create a kind of "psychic pyramid scheme" known as the Overmind which Quentin Quire, the mastermind behind the Overmind, uses to increase his own limited skills. Mesmero along with the telepaths that compose the Overmind are later confronted and killed by the Shadow King.

X-Men '92
During the Secret Wars storyline as part of the X-Men '92 mini-series (which is based on the 90's X-Men TV series), Mesmero was seen in a flashback as a member of Magneto's Brotherhood of Mutants.

In other media

Television
 Mesmero makes a brief appearance in the X-Men episode "Beyond Good and Evil, Part Four". He is seen alongside many other mutant psychics.
 Mesmero appears in X-Men: Evolution, voiced by Ron Halder. This version looks like a normal human, his main distinguishing feature being his facial tattoos, but is far more powerful and more adept at hand-to-hand combat than his comic version. The majority of his power is implied to come from Apocalypse; he is shown to match Professor X in his early appearances, but after being discarded by Apocalypse demonstrated no power whatsoever. In his first appearance in the episode "Mindbender", Mesmero used several members of the young X-Men (Jean Grey, Nightcrawler, Spyke, and Shadowcat) to steal three rings. The three rings connected together with a golden rod to form a key that would open the first of three doors sealing away Apocalypse. He was eventually discovered by Professor X and Rogue, but managed to escape with the key. In the episode "Under Lock and Key", Mesmero mind-controlled Gambit to steal half of a spider stone from Warren Worthington III's mansion. In doing so, he was found and captured by Magneto, who had Mastermind extract the location of the other half of the stone from his mind. Uniting the stone pieces created a giant metallic spider, which Magneto destroyed. Only then did he learn that Mesmero had in fact tricked him into destroying it, as doing so was the only way to unlock the second door. In the two-part episode "Dark Horizon," he tricked Mystique into unlocking the third door, as he was unable to control her mind. By unlocking the door, Mystique turned to stone. With his usefulness exhausted, Apocalypse discarded Mesmero. In the episode "Ascension" Pt. 1, Mesmero was subsequently captured by the X-Men, allowing Professor X to extract Apocalypse's master plan from his mind even though Mesmero still thinks that Apocalypse will return for him.
 Mesmero appears in Ultimate Spider-Man, voiced by Dwight Schultz. He first appears in "Freaky", shown robbing a jewelry store with some hypnotized people when Spider-Man and Wolverine arrive and foil his scheme. Mesmero is then arrested by S.H.I.E.L.D., but in revenge switches Spider-Man and Wolverine's minds without anyone noticing. After some identity confusions and a fight with Sabretooth, Spider-Man and Wolverine visit Mesmero in his cell on the S.H.I.E.L.D. Helicarrier where he is forced to switch their minds back. In the episode "The Incredible Spider-Hulk", Mesmero is seen in the Tri-Carrier's prison as Nick Fury tells Spider-Man that Mesmero plans to get into Hulk's mind as they have the safeguards in case Mesmero tries anything. A restrained Mesmero is brought into the room where Hulk is being held in. Spider-Man tries to prevent Mesmero from doing a mind trick to Hulk which ends with Spider-Man's mind being swapped with Hulk's mind. When Spider-Man in Hulk's body tries to get Mesmero to switch them back, he accidentally frees Mesmero who gets away. At the bank, Mesmero hypnotizes the guards to help him rob the bank and then mesmerizes the taxicab driver to take him to the airport. When Thing lands near Mesmero's taxicab, Mesmero mind-controls him into attacking Spider-Man and Hulk. After Thing is freed from the mind-control, he, Spider-Man, and Hulk corner Mesmero and force him to switch their minds back. Mesmero then passes out in panic while at Hulk's mercy as S.H.I.E.L.D. arrives. In the episode "Burrito Run", Spider-Man, Power Man and Squirrel Girl find Mesmero who has been tapping into people's cell phones to control their minds through the cellular network. Besides mind-controlling Batroc the Leaper, Boomerang, Grizzly and Shocker, Mesmero manages to gain control of Squirrel Girl when she answers her cell phone. When on the rooftop with his special amplifier, Mesmero gets Boomerang, Grizzly, Shocker and Squirrel Girl into defending him. Spider-Man uses liquid nitrogen to freeze Mesmero's legs. Spider-Man orders Mesmero to free everyone from his control and to forget whatever happened. Mesmero was later webbed up by Spider-Man alongside Boomerang and Shocker where they are left for the police.

References

External links
 Mesmero at Marvel.com

Characters created by Arnold Drake
Characters created by Don Heck
Comics characters introduced in 1968
Fictional characters who can teleport
Fictional hypnotists and indoctrinators
Marvel Comics male supervillains
Marvel Comics mutants